Elitsa Kostova and Florencia Molinero were the defending champions, having won the previous event in 2013, however both players chose not to participate. 

Giulia Gatto-Monticone and Anastasia Grymalska won the title, defeating Tatiana Búa and Beatriz García Vidagany in the final, 6–3, 6–1.

Seeds

Draw

External Links
 Draw

L'Open Emeraude Solaire de Saint-Malo - Doubles
L'Open Emeraude Solaire de Saint-Malo
L'Open 35 de Saint-Malo